South Wales West was a European Parliament constituency covering part of south Wales, including the city of Swansea.

Prior to its uniform adoption of proportional representation in 1999, the United Kingdom used first-past-the-post for the European elections in England, Scotland and Wales. The European Parliament constituencies used under that system were smaller than the later regional constituencies and only had one Member of the European Parliament each.

The constituency consisted of the Westminster Parliament constituencies of Aberavon, Bridgend, Gower, Neath, Ogmore, Swansea East and Swansea West.

The constituency replaced parts of South Wales and Mid and West Wales in 1994 and became part of the much larger Wales constituency in 1999.

Members of the European Parliament

Results

References

External links
 David Boothroyd's United Kingdom Election Results

European Parliament constituencies in Wales (1979–1999)
1994 establishments in Wales
1999 disestablishments in Wales
Constituencies established in 1994
Constituencies disestablished in 1999